Hajiamir-e Pain (also Romanized as Hajiamir-e Paein)  is a village in Heyran Rural District, in the Central District of Astara County, Gilan Province, Iran.

References 

Populated places in Astara County